"The Lion's Roar" is the title track of the album The Lion's Roar by the Swedish folk band First Aid Kit. Written by Klara Söderberg and Johanna Söderberg, the song was released as the first single from the album and entered the Swedish Singles Chart at #38, and then rose to #34 the following week.

Charts

Usage in media
The game The Long Dark features the song as the introduction sequence to episodes 2, 3 and 4 of the story mode.

The song is heard during the end credits of episode 5, season 2 of the show Mythic Quest.

References

2012 singles
First Aid Kit (band) songs
2011 songs
Wichita Recordings singles